The Hampstead Players are a notable amateur theatre group in north London, named after their base in Hampstead.  It was founded in 1976.  It produces three productions a year - spring, summer (usually Shakespeare) and autumn - in the parish church of St John-at-Hampstead.  It also has a youth theatre wing, the Hampstead Players Youth Theatre (HPYT).

Productions

(A) = Adaptation

Notes

External links
Hampstead Players homepage

Performing groups established in 1976
Amateur theatre companies in London